Lyons Dam (National ID # CA00387) is a dam in Tuolumne County, California.

The concrete single-arch dam was constructed in 1930 by the Pacific Gas and Electric Company, with a height of 132 feet, and a length of 535 feet at its crest.  It impounds the South Fork Stanislaus River for the municipal water supply of the Twain Harte, California area.  Owned and operated by Pacific Gas and Electric Company, the largest private owner of hydroelectric facilities in the United States, it is one of the company's 174 dams.

Recreation includes fishing. The site is surrounded by the Stanislaus National Forest.

See also 

List of dams and reservoirs in California
List of lakes in California

References 

Dams in California
Dams on the Stanislaus River
Buildings and structures in Tuolumne County, California
Arch dams
Pacific Gas and Electric Company dams
Hydroelectric power plants in California
Dams completed in 1916
Energy infrastructure completed in 1930
Reservoirs in Tuolumne County, California
Reservoirs in Northern California